James Litherland (born 6 September 1949) is an English singer and guitarist best known as a founding member of the progressive rock band Colosseum. He was born in Salford, Lancashire, England. He is the father of singer and producer James Blake, who adapted his father's song "Where to Turn" into "The Wilhelm Scream".

Discography
With Colosseum
Those Who Are About to Die Salute You – 1968 
Valentyne Suite – 1969
The Grass Is Greener – 1970

With Mogul Thrash
 Mogul Thrash 1971

With John Baldry
 Everything Stops for Tea, 1972

With Leo Sayer
 Just a Boy, 1974

With Bandit
 Bandit, 1976

Solo
 4th Estate, 2006
 Real Men Cry, 2006

 As Session Musician
 Finbar Furey with The Fureys, 1968
 Fly On Strangewings with Jade, 1970
 Stranded with Edwards Hand, 1970
 Rainshine with Edwards Hand, 1971
 Marriott with Steve Marriott, 1976
 The Party Album with Alexis Korner, 1979

References

External links

1949 births
English rock guitarists
English rock singers
Living people
Musicians from Greater Manchester
People from Salford
Musicians from Ipswich
Colosseum (band) members
Bandit (band) members